Douglas Tait is a Canadian children's book illustrator. He won the Amelia Frances Howard-Gibbon Illustrator's Award in 1981 for illustrating The Trouble with Princesses, written by Christie Harris.

References

External links

 

Canadian children's book illustrators
Living people
Year of birth missing (living people)
Place of birth missing (living people)